Gelder may refer to:

People 
Alfred Gelder (1855–1941), British architect and Liberal politician
Ian Gelder (born 1949), English actor
Aert de Gelder (1645–1727), Dutch painter of biblical scenes and portraits
Beatrice de Gelder (born 1944), Belgian cognitive neuroscientist and neuropsychologist
 (1765–1848), Dutch mathematician; see 
Kim De Gelder (born 1988), Belgian mass murderer

Places
 Gelderland, a Dutch province
 Guelders, a historical county in what is now the eastern Netherlands (including Gelderland)
 Gelder, Iran (disambiguation), several places

See also

Van Gelder
Geldern, a city in the northwest of the federal state North Rhine-Westphalia, Germany